Amada-Gaza is a sub-prefecture of Mambéré in the Central African Republic.

Geography 
The locality is located 130 km northwest of the capital of Berberati prefecture in the valley of the river Boumbé I, tributary of Kadéï.

History  
In 2002, the locality became chief town of one of the seven sub-prefectures of Mambéré-Kadeï, resulting from a division of the sub-prefecture of Gamboula. Since at least May 2014 Amada-Gaza had been under control of the Anti-balaka. French journalist Camille Lepage was killed while traveling there with militiamen. On 7 March 2021 it was recaptured by government forces.

Administration 
The sub-prefecture consists of the single commune of Haute-Boumbé.  The locality of Amada-Gaza has 4,100 inhabitants in March 2015, including 800 displaced persons.

References 

Sub-prefectures of the Central African Republic
Populated places in the Central African Republic